Kester Sylvester (born 5 December 1973) is a Grenadian cricketer. He played in 37 first-class and 12 List A matches for the Windward Islands from 1992 to 2003.

See also
 List of Windward Islands first-class cricketers

References

External links
 

1973 births
Living people
Grenadian cricketers
Windward Islands cricketers